Sierra Mojada is one of the 38 municipalities of Coahuila, in north-eastern Mexico. The municipal seat lies at Sierra Mojada. The municipality covers an area of 6966.2 km².

As of 2005, the municipality had a total population of 5,245.

References

Municipalities of Coahuila